Kateekal Sankaranarayanan (15 October 1932 – 24 April 2022) was the governor of the Indian state of Maharashtra. He had also served as the Governor of Nagaland and Jharkhand. Prior to his appointment as governor, he had served as a minister in several Congress led governments of Kerala headed by Chief Ministers A K Antony and K. Karunakaran. On 24 August 2014, he was transferred by the NDA government to Mizoram.

Sankaranarayanan was also asked to assume the additional charge of Arunachal Pradesh during the absence on leave of S K Singh. The swear-in ceremony was held on 7 April 2007. When Singh was appointed Governor of Rajasthan on 19 August 2007, Sankaranarayanan was also appointed Governor of Arunachal Pradesh, and he was sworn in on 4 September 2007. He remained in that post until January 2008, when Joginder Jaswant Singh became governor of Arunachal Pradesh. On 22 January 2010, he was sworn in as the Governor of Maharashtra. On 27 August 2011 he was given additional charge of Goa until the Indian government appointed B V Wanchoo to the post on 4 May 2012.

Early life and career 
Sankaranarayanan, veteran Congress leader, was born on 15 October 1932 in the city of Palakkad in the state of Kerala as the son of A Sankaran Nair and Smt K Lekshmi Amma.

He entered politics while a student and had been an active member of the Students Organisation since 1946.
Sankaranarayanan became elected to 5th KLA from Thrithala, 6th KLA from Sreekrishnapuram, 8th KLA from Ottappalam, and later, also to the 11th KLA, from Palghat constituency as an  Indian National Congress member.

From 11 April 1977 to 25 April 1977 he handled the portfolios of Agriculture, Animal Husbandry and Dairy Development, and Community Development, in the Ministry headed by K Karunakaran. From 27 April 1977 to 27 October 1978, he handled the same portfolios in the Ministry headed by A K Antony. Again from 26 May 2001 to 29 August 2004, he was the Minister for Finance in the Ministry headed by A K Antony. He held the portfolios of Excise as well, until 10 February 2004. From 1989 to 1991 he served also as the chairman of the committee on Public Accounts and from 1980 to 1982 he was the chairman of the committee on Government Assurances. And from 1985 to 2001, he was the Convenor of the UDF.
Along with that, he held various positions in the party as secretary, District Congress Committee, president, KPCC (O), general secretary, KPCC, member, All India Working Committee, and member, Parliamentary Board Congress (O).

Death 
Sankaranarayanan died on 24 April 2022 at his home in Sekharipuram, India from complications of a stroke, aged 89. He was cremated with full state honours at the premises of his ancestral home in Painkulam, Thrissur district

References 

1932 births
2022 deaths
Governors of Assam
Governors of Nagaland
Governors of Jharkhand
Governors of Maharashtra
Governors of Arunachal Pradesh
Governors of Goa
Malayali politicians
People from Palakkad
Indian National Congress politicians from Kerala